Romance in a Minor Key is a 1943 German historical drama film directed by Helmut Käutner and starring Marianne Hoppe, Paul Dahlke, and Ferdinand Marian. It was shot at the Johannisthal Studios in Berlin. The film's sets were designed by the art directors Otto Erdmann and Franz F. Fürst.

Cast

References

External links

Romance in a Minor Key at filmportal.de/en

1943 romantic drama films
1940s historical romance films
German historical romance films
Films of Nazi Germany
German romantic drama films
Films directed by Helmut Käutner
Tobis Film films
Films based on short fiction
Films based on works by Guy de Maupassant
Films set in Paris
Films set in the 1880s
Adultery in films
Films about suicide
German black-and-white films
1940s German-language films
1940s German films
Films shot at Johannisthal Studios